This is a list of American television-related events in 1950.

Events

Other information
One million American households were reported to own a television set in 1950.

Television programs

Debuts

Change in Network Affiliation

Ending this year

Television stations

Station launches

Network affiliation changes

Births

Deaths

References

External links 
List of 1950 American television series at IMDb